Pangea Aviation Academy (PAA), is an aviation training school in Uganda, which provides training for prospective pilots, destined for service in the UPDF Air Force, the Uganda Police Air Wing, Uganda National Airlines Company and in General Aviation, in the country and the region.

Location

The geographical coordinates of the campus of Pangea Aviation Academy are:00°11'56.0"N, 32°33'01.0"E (Latitude:0.198889; Longitude:32.550278).

Overview
The training institution s privately owned. The school was established in 1997, to address the shortage of flight professionals in Uganda and the region. Graduates of PAA usually find employment with local and regional airlines.

Courses
, the courses offered at PAA, lead to proficiency in piloting fixed wing aircraft, jet-engine aircraft and rotary engine aircraft (helicopters). The ourses offered include: (a) Private Pilot Licence (b) Commercial Pilot Licence (c) Instrument Rating Course (d) Flight Operations Officer Course.

Other courses include (e) Elementary Flight Training (f) Fast Jet Training (g) Initial Entry Rotary Wing Training (h) Initial Night Vision Goggle Helicopter Course (i) Advanced Night Vision Goggle Helicopter Course (j) Initial Night Vision Goggle Fixed Wing Course (k) Intelligence, Surveillance and Reconnaissance Pilot/Camera Operator and Intelligence Analysis Course. This second set of courses require prior government security clearance.

See also
List of aviation schools in Uganda
List of airports in Uganda

References

External links
 Website of Pangea Aviation Academy
 Meet The Uganda Airlines Pilots As of 29 April 2019.
 Aviation: A Silently Growing Area As of 20 March 2018.

Wakiso District
Aviation schools in Uganda
Education companies established in 1997
1997 establishments in Uganda